Kari Ristanen (born 27 July 1958) was a Finnish cross-country skier who competed during the 1980s. He won a bronze medal in the 4 × 10 km relay at the 1984 Winter Olympics in Sarajevo.

Ristanen also won a silver in the 4 × 10 km relay at the 1989 FIS Nordic World Ski Championships in Lahti.

His best individual finish was second twice in the World Cup (1985, 1986).

Cross-country skiing results
All results are sourced from the International Ski Federation (FIS).

Olympic Games
 1 medal – (1 bronze)

World Championships
1 medal – (1 silver)

World Cup

Season standings

Individual podiums
3 podiums

Team podiums

 4 podiums – (4 ) 

Note:  Until the 1999 World Championships and the 1994 Olympics, World Championship and Olympic races were included in the World Cup scoring system.

References

External links
 
 

Finnish male cross-country skiers
1958 births
Living people
Cross-country skiers at the 1984 Winter Olympics
Cross-country skiers at the 1988 Winter Olympics
Olympic medalists in cross-country skiing
FIS Nordic World Ski Championships medalists in cross-country skiing
Medalists at the 1984 Winter Olympics
Olympic bronze medalists for Finland
Olympic cross-country skiers of Finland
Sportspeople from Tampere
20th-century Finnish people
21st-century Finnish people